Zingiber sabuanum is a species of the ginger family that is endemic to Western Ghats in India.

References

sabuanum
Endemic flora of India (region)